Khana Darreh or Khena Darreh may refer to:
 Khana Darreh-ye Olya
 Khana Darreh-ye Sofla